State assembly elections were held in Malaysia on 8 March 2008 in all states except Sarawak. The elections took place alongside general elections.

Results

Perlis

The Sanglang seat won by Abdullah Hassan (BN) during the election was declared vacant by the Perlis Election Court in June 2008 on grounds of error during the ballot counting process. In September, Hashim Jasin (PAS) was declared the rightful winner of the seat.

Kedah

Kelantan

Terengganu

Penang

Perak

Pahang

Selangor

Negeri Sembilan

Malacca

Johor

Sabah

References

State elections in Malaysia
state